

The Goyder Lagoon is a large ephemeral swamp in the Australian state of South Australia in the state's Far North region. The lake is part of the Diamantina River floodplain, lying beside the Birdsville Track close to the state border with Queensland.

It is located within the gazetted locality of Clifton Hills Station which is occupied by the pastoral lease of the same name.

Exceptionally large floods in the Georgina-Mulligan River system may contribute water to the north-western side of Goyder Lagoon via  Eyre Creek and the Warburton River. Most of the lagoon consists of shallow, braided micro-channels.

Goyder Lagoon was named in 1875 by J W Lewis after George Goyder, the Surveyor General of South Australia from 1861 to 1894.

Environment protection and other classifications
While Goyder Lagoon itself is not part of any protected area, it does receive consideration for protection under the provisions of state planning legislation on the basis of its location within “a variety of environments including arid and wetland environments, ranges and riverine environments.”  It is also located both within an area listed on the Directory of Important Wetlands in Australia as the Diamantina River Wetland System and an area of land nominated as an important bird area by BirdLife International, an international non-governmental organization, as the Goyder Lagoon Important Bird Area.

Diamantina River Wetland System
Goyder Lagoon is located at the southern extent of the Diamantina River Wetland System, which is listed on the Directory of Important Wetlands in Australia because it is considered a “good example of a major, unregulated, arid zone river with a relatively pristine biota, an exceptional hydrological environment and extensive uncultivated floodplains.”

Goyder Lagoon Important Bird Area
The IBA supports over 1% of the world populations of freckled ducks, Australian terns and breeding royal spoonbills. A small population of yellow chats occurs at the Koonchera waterhole. Other bird species for which the site is important include the letter-winged kite, inland dotterel, grey and Eyrean grasswrens, black and pied honeyeaters, gibberbird, banded whiteface, chirruping wedgebill and cinnamon quail-thrush. In particular, the lagoon is reported as being the site of the largest waterbird aggregations which are found on its southern side including several species of cormorants, ducks, herons and ibises.

See also

 List of lakes of South Australia

References

Wetlands of South Australia
Lakes of South Australia
Far North (South Australia)
Lake Eyre basin
Floodplains of Australia